The Therapeutic Goods Administration (TGA) is the medicine and therapeutic regulatory agency of the Australian Government. As part of the Department of Health and Aged Care, the TGA regulates the quality, supply and advertising of medicines, pathology devices, medical devices, blood products and most other therapeutics. Any items that claim to have a therapeutic effect, are involved in the administration of medication, or are otherwise covered by the Therapeutic Goods Act 1989, the Therapeutic Goods Regulations 1990, or a ministerial order, must be approved by the TGA and registered in the Australian Register of Therapeutic Goods.

Structure of the TGA and medical regulation in Australia 
In Australia, medical products are regulated by the TGA and, for controlled drugs such as cannabis, the Office of Drug Control (ODC). Together, the TGA and ODC form the Health Products Regulation Group within the Department of Health and Aged Care. The Health Products Regulation Group comprises 11 regulatory branches and one legal branch, organised into three divisions. The Regulatory Services and Drug Control branch is the only one to not be part of the TGA.

The TGA also includes seven specialised statutory committees, which the agency can call upon for assistance on technical or scientific issues. Four other committees also exist to give guidance on annual influenza vaccines, industry consultation matters, and the Therapeutic Goods Advertising Code.

Proposed regulation agency with New Zealand
In September 2003, the Australian and New Zealand Government signed a treaty to establish a common therapeutic regulatory agency for the two countries. Australia New Zealand Therapeutic Products Agency, as it was to be called, would replace the TGA and Medsafe, the national regulator in New Zealand. In June 2011, eight years after the original treaty, Australian Prime Minister Julia Gillard and New Zealand Prime Minister John Key signed a letter of intent, reaffirming plans to create such an agency.

In November 2014, both Australia and New Zealand agreed to cease plans to create a shared regulator, citing "a comprehensive review of progress and assessment of the costs and benefits to each country". The joint statement announcing the cessation outlines that both the TGA and Medsafe would continue to cooperate on medicine regulation and that the New Zealand Government would still participate in the now defunct, Council of Australian Governments Health Council.

COVID-19 vaccine approval and distribution

Pfizer–BioNTech vaccine

On 25 January 2021, the TGA provisionally approved the two-dose Pfizer–BioNTech COVID-19 vaccine, named COMIRNATY, for use within Australia. The provisional approval only recommends the vaccine for patients over the age of 16, pending ongoing submission of clinical data from the vaccine sponsors (the manufacturers, Pfizer and BioNTech). Additionally, every batch of vaccines have their composition and documentation verified by TGA laboratories before being distributed to medical providers.

The Department of Health and Aged Care planned the administration of COVID-19 vaccinations in five phases, organised by the risk of exposure. Border, quarantine, and front-line health and aged care workers were vaccinated first, followed by over 70 year-olds, other health care workers, and essential emergency service members. Following the provisional approval of COMIRNATY, Prime Minister Scott Morrison said that it was planned for the first group to begin vaccinations by February 2021, six weeks earlier than originally planned.

The first public COVID-19 vaccination in Australia actually took place on 21 February 2021 with the Pfizer–BioNTech vaccine at Castle Hill in Sydney. An 84-year-old  aged care resident was the first Australian to receive the vaccine.  To show confidence in the national immunisation vaccine rollout, Prime Minister Morrison and Chief Medical Officer Professor Paul Kelly also received vaccinations.

On 23 February 2021, Australia's second shipment of the Pfizer vaccine arrived at Sydney airport. Health Minister Hunt confirmed the arrival of 166,000 doses, and 120,000 more doses expected to arrive in the following week.

On 9 April 2021, Prime Minister Morrison announced that Australia had secured another 20 million doses of Pfizer vaccine on top of 20 million already on order, meaning 40 million doses should be available to Australians in 2021. This was amid concerns about the AstraZeneca vaccine, in rare cases, causing blood clots; see section Oxford–AstraZeneca vaccine below. The additional doses of Pfizer were expected to arrive in Australia in the last quarter of 2021.

On 23 July 2021, the TGA approved the Pfizer COVID-19 vaccine for teenagers between 12 and 15 years old.

On 5 December 2021, the TGA provisionally approved the Pfizer COVID-19 vaccine access for five to 11-year-olds.

Oxford–AstraZeneca vaccine 

On 16 February 2021, the Oxford–AstraZeneca vaccine was approved by the TGA for use in Australia. The administration of this vaccine was scheduled to start in March. Two weeks later, on 28 February, the first shipment of the vaccine, around 300,000 doses, arrived at Sydney for rollout from 8 March. On 5 March 2021, Italy stopped the export of AstraZeneca vaccine to Australia due to their slower rollout of that vaccine in the EU. On 23 March, TGA approved the first batch of locally manufactured AstraZeneca vaccine by CSL-Seqirus in Melbourne, and 832,200 doses were ready for rollout in the following weeks.

On 17 June 2021, Federal Health minister Greg Hunt announced a rise in the age limit for administration of the AstraZeneca vaccine. After new advice from the Australian Technical Advisory Group on Immunisation (ATAGI), the vaccine was no longer recommended for people aged under 60 years. This advice came after new cases of blood clotting, thrombosis with thrombocytopenia syndrome (TTS), in those under 60 after AstraZeneca vaccinations.

On 23 June 2021, the Federal government released vaccine allocation projections and forecast that the Oxford-AstraZeneca vaccine would be in "little need" past October 2021 when all Australians over 60 years were expected to be fully vaccinated.

On 9 February 2022 within Australia the Oxford-AstraZeneca vaccine was approved by the TGA (still pending ATAGI approval) as booster vaccines for individuals - joining Pfizer and Moderna booster vaccines for individuals approved months ago.

Janssen COVID-19 vaccine

On 25 June 2021, provisional approval was given by the TGA to the Janssen COVID-19 vaccine, the third vaccine for potential use in Australia. Strict conditions were imposed on Janssen which includes further investigation documents related to the efficacy, long term effects and safety concerns that must be provided regularly to TGA. It is still not included in the vaccination programme.

See also 
 Medsafe, New Zealand's health regulation agency
 International Council for Harmonisation of Technical Requirements for Pharmaceuticals for Human Use
 Standard for the Uniform Scheduling of Medicines and Poisons
 COVID-19 vaccination in Australia

Notes

References

External links
 
 Official website - Office of Drug Control

Commonwealth Government agencies of Australia
Medical and health organisations based in Australia
National agencies for drug regulation
Regulation of medical devices
Life sciences industry
Regulatory authorities of Australia